Saint-Cirq-Lapopie is a commune in the Lot department in south-western France. It is a member of the Les Plus Beaux Villages de France (The most beautiful villages in France) association.

Its position on a steep cliff 100m above the river, originally selected for defence, has helped make the town one of the most popular tourist destinations in the department, and the entire town is almost a museum. After being 'discovered' by the Post-Impressionist Henri Martin it became popular with other artists and the home of the writer André Breton.

Location
Saint-Cirq-Lapopie is 30 km east of Cahors, in the regional natural park . The village overlooks the Lot River.

History
The stronghold of Saint-Cirq-Lapopie was the main seat of one of the four viscounties that made up Quercy, divided among four feudal dynasties, the Lapopie, Gourdon, Cardaillac and Castelnau families.

Way of St James
Saint-Cirq-Lapopie is on the French pilgrimage route, Way of St. James. Coming from Cabrerets pilgrims would pass through and then continue to Cahors, visiting St Stephen's cathedral.

Notable people
Charles Rappoport (1865–1941) – Lithuanian-born militant communist politician, journalist and writer
Poet André Breton spent time there in the 1950s in his 'auberge des Mariniers'.
Artist Pierre Daura lived there for many years.

Popularity
The Guardian reported in July 2012 that the village received 400,000 visitors each year, mostly from within France, and that it had become "besieged by tourists" since winning a popularity vote on a French television programme in June 2012.

See also
Communes of the Lot department

References

External links
Tourism office

Communes of Lot (department)
Plus Beaux Villages de France